Canowie may refer to
 Canowie Station pastoral lease
 Canowie, South Australia locality south of what remains of the pastoral lease